The Aktay or Aqtay is a river in Tatarstan, Russian Federation, a left-bank tributary of the Volga, falling into the Kuybyshev Reservoir near Izmeri.

The major tributaries are Chelninka, Salmanka, and Romodanka. Drainage is regulated. In the upper stream use to dry. Bazarnye Mataki is along the river.

References 

Rivers of Tatarstan